The Iraq men's national volleyball team represents Iraq in international volleyball competitions and friendly matches. The team is currently ranked 131st in the world.

Results

Asian Championship

 Champions   Runners up   Third place   Fourth place

Asian Games

 Champions   Runners up   Third place   Fourth place

Asian Cup

 Champions   Runners up   Third place   Fourth place

Asian Challenge Cup

 Champions   Runners up   Third place   Fourth place

References

External links
FIVB profile

National sports teams of Iraq
National men's volleyball teams
Volleyball in Iraq